The W. L. McKnight Stakes is an American Grade 3 Thoroughbred horse race held annually at Gulfstream Park in Hallandale Beach, Florida. Inaugurated in 1973 at Calder Race Course it remained there through 2013 when the track closed. In 2017 a race condition was changed from being open to horses age three and older to those who were four and older. A race on turf at a distance of a mile and one-half, due to safety concerns it was shifted from the turf course to the main dirt track in 1993, 2005, and 2013.

The race was named for William L. McKnight, the founder of Tartan Farms. Prior to 2019, it was run as the W. L. McKnight Handicap.

Historical notes
Twilight Eclipse has the distinction of winning the McKnight Handicap back-to-back on two different racing surfaces. At Calder Race Course, the gelding won the race on grass in 2012 and in 2013 on dirt after it was switched from a soggy grass course to the dirt track. It was only the second time in his career that Twilight Eclipse had run on dirt.

In 1995, Flag Down set the race record that still stood when the Calder track closed. Flag Down was bred by Windfields Farm and raced by Allen Paulson who at the time was also racing the great future U. S. Racing Hall of Fame inductee Cigar.

Of its fifty-three runnings, no female horse has won the McKnight.

Records
Speed record:
 2:25.90 @ 1 miles on Gulfstream Park turf course: Taghleeb (2017)
 2:24.11 @ 1 miles on Calder turf course: Flag Down (1995)

Most wins:
 2 – Flying Pidgeon (1985, 1986)
 2 – Twilight Eclipse (2012, 2013)
 2 – Presious Passion (2007, 2008)

Most wins by a jockey:
 4 – José Santos (1985, 1986, 1990, 1995)

Most wins by a trainer:
 5 – Michael J. Maker (2017, 2018, 2019, 2021, 2023)

Most wins by an owner:
 2 – Buckram Oak Farm (Mahmoud Fustok) (1980, 1982)
 2 – Constance Daparma & Marjan Stable, Inc. (1985, 1986)
 2 – Patricia A. Generazio (2007, 2008)
 2 – West Point Thoroughbreds, Inc. (Terry Finley CEO) (2012, 2013)
 2 – Ken & Sarah Ramsey (2015, 2018)
 2 – Michael M. Hui (2017, 2019)

Winners

References

Graded stakes races in the United States
Turf races in the United States
Open middle distance horse races
Horse races in Florida
Gulfstream Park
Calder Race Course
Recurring sporting events established in 1973
1973 establishments in Florida